The India women's national cricket team toured New Zealand in February 1995. They first played against New Zealand in one Test match and one One Day International, drawing the Test and winning the ODI. They then played against New Zealand and Australia in the New Zealand Women's Centenary Tournament, an ODI tri-series, which they won, beating New Zealand in the final.

Tour Matches

3-day match: New Zealand Emerging Players v India

50-over match: New Zealand Emerging Players v India

Only WTest

Only WODI

Tri-Series

Group stage

Final

See also
 1994–95 New Zealand Women's Centenary Tournament

References

External links
India Women tour of New Zealand 1994/95 from Cricinfo

India 1995
New Zealand 1995
1995 in women's cricket